The SAS Frösundavik Office Building is an office building in , Solna Municipality, Sweden, north of Stockholm. It serves as the head office of Scandinavian Airlines (SAS) and the SAS Group. The SAS head office was for a brief period located in a different building on the property of Stockholm Arlanda Airport in Sigtuna Municipality.

In 2000 Jurian van Meel, author of The European Office: Office Design and National Context, wrote that the former SAS head office "is probably Sweden's best known 'groundscraper'"; Meel stated that Sweden's groundscrapers are more well known compared to high-rise buildings, which according to Meel are not common in Sweden.<ref name=Meelp97>van Meel, Jurian. The European Office: Office Design and National Context. 010 Publishers, 2000. 97. Retrieved from Google Books on 12 February 2010. , .</ref>

The building also houses offices of E. Merck AB, the Swedish representation of Merck KGaA Germany. CSC Sverige AB, a subsidiary of Computer Sciences Corporation, also has its offices in the building."CSC in Stockholm" (Archive). Computer Sciences Corporation. Retrieved on August 5, 2014. "Stockholm Frösundaviks allé 1 195 87 Stockholm"

History
The head office was built from 1985 through 1987 by the Norwegian architect Niels Torp. SAS intended to build its head office in the lake Brunnsviken area, near an exit to Stockholm Arlanda Airport. The plans caused controversy since the municipal and regional planners wanted the area to be used for recreation purposes. The Swedish government was about to sell land in the Brunnsviken area, and was interested in SAS having its main office in the area of Stockholm. So SAS took a plot of land, while the beaches and scenic elements of the area were retained. In 1984 SAS held a competition amongst nine architects to determine who would get to design the head office. Niels Torp won the competition and a  complex was built. When the building opened, there were 2,000 employees.

Around 2010, SAS had reduced its space in the building due to reductions in staffing. Therefore, portions of the building were leased to other companies. Around 2010 the building owner, Nordisk Renting AB, decided to sell it to Norwegian KLP for 1.5 billion Swedish kronor. In 2010 SAS announced that it would relocate its head office to Stockholm-Arlanda Airport, with the move scheduled for the northern hemisphere autumn of that year.

In 2013 SAS announced that it once again would relocate to Frösundavik, partly because it was hard to find another user of the large custom made office building.

Features
The building has seven separate building blocks with a street, covered by a glass roof, connecting the corridors. The street is lined with shops and cafes. Jeremy Myerson, author of "After modernism: the contemporary office environment" said that the SAS building, which opened in January 1988, "refashioned entirely the traditional notion of office life by creating a giant complex with shops, restaurants, and coffee bars lining a solar-heated internal 'main street'" running through the facility's spine. Jan Carlzon, former CEO, explained that the concept was to promote SAS senior managers promenading through the corridor and meeting staff members informally. Myerson added that the building "moved as far away from Taylorism in aesthetic and organisational terms as one could get."

The Frösundavik Aquifer is the building's source for cool groundwater used in summer months and warm groundwater in winter months.

 See also 

 Waterside (building), the head-office for British Airways. It was designed by Niels Torp and shares substantial design elements with Frösundavik.
 Cathay City (Cathay Pacific head office in Hong Kong)
 CAL Park (China Airlines head office in Taoyuan, Taiwan)

References

Further reading
 Johansson, Sam. SAS Frösundavik : an office heated and cooled by groundwater.  (Statens råd för byggnadsforskning), 1992. . See profile (Archive).

External links
  SAS flyttar åter till Frösunda – nära 14000 kvm aktuellt" (Archive). ''. 24 May 2013.

Airline headquarters
Scandinavian Airlines
SAS Group
Solna Municipality
Office buildings completed in 1987
1987 establishments in Sweden
Buildings and structures in Stockholm County